Lee Ho-Youn (born May 3, 1971) is a South Korean team handball player and Olympic champion. She won the gold medal at the 1992 Summer Olympics in Barcelona, with the Korean national team.

References

External links

1971 births
Living people
South Korean female handball players
Olympic handball players of South Korea
Handball players at the 1992 Summer Olympics
Olympic gold medalists for South Korea
Olympic medalists in handball
Asian Games medalists in handball
Handball players at the 1994 Asian Games
Medalists at the 1992 Summer Olympics
Asian Games gold medalists for South Korea
Medalists at the 1994 Asian Games